Mark Wadlow (born 1962) is an English screenwriter known for his partnership with Peter Morgan and his work on the ITV soap opera Coronation Street.

Early life 
Wadlow was born in Middlesbrough, England and attended St Francis Primary School. When he was 10, his family moved to the Hemlington area of the town, and he attended St George's Catholic School. At the age of 19, Wadlow began studying at the University of Leeds.

Writing career 
At Leeds, Wadlow began writing with Peter Morgan. In 1984, he and Morgan wrote a play entitled Gross, based on his summer job in a call centre, which they took to the Edinburgh Festival. At Edinburgh, Wadlow and Morgan were approached by a member of staff from a company that made training videos, who asked them if they would like jobs writing training films. Wadlow and Morgan accepted the job and wrote training films for many years. Wadlow and Morgan returned to Edinburgh in 1986 with the play Pax Britannica. In 1988, Wadlow and Morgan wrote additional material for Ruth Prawer Jhabvala's script for John Schlesinger's film Madame Sousatzka. Morgan recalled, "We were incredibly cheap and totally exploited for six months for about five grand". In 1990, Wadlow and Morgan co-wrote Dear Rosie, a short film directed by Peter Cattaneo. The short was nominated in the Best Short Film category at the 44th British Academy Film Awards, and the Short Film (Live Action) category at the 63rd Academy Awards.

After Wadlow and Morgan rewrote the script for the John Goodman film King Ralph (1991), they ended their writing partnership. Wadlow joined the writing staff of the ITV television soap opera Coronation Street in 1993 and has since become a senior storyliner. Throughout the rest of the 1990s, he wrote episodes of the topical comedy series The House of Windsor (1994), the soap opera Castles (1995), the sitcom Holding the Baby (1997), and the World Cup-themed comedy series Lost in France (1998). In 2000, he wrote an episode of the ITV prison drama Bad Girls and in 2006 wrote an episode of the BBC series Robin Hood.

As a member of the Coronation Street writing team, Wadlow has been the recipient of two Writers' Guild of Great Britain awards (1993 and 2009).

List of works

Theatre 
Gross (1984, co-writer)
Pax Britannica (1986, co-writer)

Film 
Madame Sousatzka (1988, co-writer)
Dear Rosie (1990, co-writer)
King Ralph (1991, co-writer, rewrites)
 (1992, co-writer)

Television 
Coronation Street (1993—, 230+ episodes)
The House of Windsor (1994, 6 episodes)
Castles (1995, 2 episodes)
Holding the Baby (1997, 5 episodes)
Lost in France (1998, 12 episodes)
Bad Girls (2000, 1 episode)
Robin Hood (2006, 1 episode)

DVD film 
Coronation Street: Out of Africa (2008, co-writer)

References 

"WADLOW, Mark filmography". British Film Institute. Retrieved on 7 June 2010.

External links 

1962 births
British soap opera writers
British television writers
English television writers
English screenwriters
English male screenwriters
English soap opera writers
Living people
British male television writers